The 2nd New Brunswick Legislative Assembly represented New Brunswick between January 3, 1793, and 1795.

The assembly sat at the pleasure of the Governor of New Brunswick, Thomas Carleton. All sessions were held in Fredericton in a building rented for that purpose.

The speaker of the house was selected as Amos Botsford.

History

Members 

Notes:

References 
Journal of the votes and proceedings of the House of Assembly of ... New-Brunswick from ... February to ... March, 1793 (1793)

02
1793 in Canada
1794 in Canada
1795 in Canada
1793 establishments in New Brunswick
1795 disestablishments in New Brunswick